A heroine is a female hero.

Heroine or Heroines may also refer to:

Music 
Heroine (From First to Last album) or the title song, 2006
Heroine (Minori Chihara album), 2004
 Heroine, an album by the Wild Strawberries, 1995
 "Heroine" (Shakespears Sister song), 1988
 "Heroine" (Sunmi song), 2018
 "Heroine", a song by Blonde Redhead from 23, 2007
 "Heroine", a song by Nami Tamaki from Make Progress, 2005
 "Heroine", a song by Sleeping with Sirens from Madness, 2015
 "Heroine", a song by Suede from Dog Man Star, 1994

Films
The Heroine, a 1967 uncompleted lost film by Orson Welles
Heroine (1972 film), an Argentine film
Heroine (2005 film), a Spanish film
Heroine (2012 film), a Bollywood film
Heroin(e), a 2017 documentary film
Héroïnes, a 1997 French film

Other uses 
HMS Heroine, four ships of the British Royal Navy
Heroine-class submarine, a class of submarine of the South African Navy
Heroines: Powerful Indian Women of Myth and History, a 2017 book by Ira Mukhoty
Gertrude Yorkes or Heroine, a Marvel Comics superhero character

See also
"Hero/Heroine", a 2006 song by Boys Like Girls
Heroine Virtual, an open source software company
Heroin (disambiguation)
Heroina (fish), a genus of fish belonging to the family Cichlidae